Brebbia is a comune (municipality) in the Province of Varese in the Italian region Lombardy, located about  northwest of Milan and about  west of Varese.

Brebbia borders the following municipalities: Besozzo, Ispra, Malgesso, Travedona-Monate and Cadrezzate.

The main church is St. Peter and Paul Church, Brebbia. It is located in the centre of the town.

References

External links
 Official website

Cities and towns in Lombardy